Scalopolacerta is an extinct genus of non-mammalian synapsids.

See also
 List of therapsids

References

 The main groups of non-mammalian synapsids at Mikko's Phylogeny Archive

Baurioids
Fossil taxa described in 1979
Therocephalia genera